"Presto" is a song by Samoan Australian hip hop group No Money Enterprise, independently released as a single on 2 October 2020. 

"Presto" received a nomination in the Hip Hop / Rap category at the 2021 Queensland Music Awards.

Background and release
"Presto" was released on 2 October 2020.

Critical reception
Frank Tremain and Matthew Craig of AU Dollars commended the song, writing that No Money Enterprise "always deliver a strong presence and energy, none of which is lacking on latest drop, "Presto"." They also praised the group's "natural chemistry", with each of the members adding their own flavour to another banging beat."

Awards and nominations

! 
|-
! scope="row"| 2021
| "Presto"
| Hip Hop / Rap
| 
| 
|}

Music video
The music video for the song was directed by Carlin Leota and Kevin Bar.

Live performances
No Money Enterprise performed "Presto" live at the 2021 Queensland Music Awards on 5 May 2021.

Credits and personnel
Adapted from Spotify.

No Money Enterprise
 RB – performance, writing
 Rndy OT $vge – performance, writing
 Stallyon Junz – performance, writing
 Tommy.OT – performance, writing

Other musicians
 Frank van Rooijen – writing
 Skwatta Boi – production

References

External links
 

2020 singles
2020 songs
No Money Enterprise songs